William "Tosher" Burns (29 December 1902 – September 1984) was an Irish international footballer who played professionally in Ireland, England and the United States as a centre back.

Career
Born in Newtownards, Burns began his career in his native Ireland with the youth teams of Nortonville and Ulster. He began his senior career in November 1921 with Ards, and later played for Glentoran, Wolverhampton Wanderers, Shelbourne, Philadelphia Celtic, J & P Coats, Workington, Ards United and Belfast St. Peters.

Burns also earned one international cap for Ireland in 1924.

References
NIFG

1902 births
1984 deaths
Association footballers from Northern Ireland
Pre-1950 IFA international footballers
Ards F.C. players
Glentoran F.C. players
Wolverhampton Wanderers F.C. players
Shelbourne F.C. players
Workington A.F.C. players
English Football League players
Ulster F.C. players
Association football defenders